Chaunanthus is a genus of flowering plants belonging to the family Brassicaceae.

Its native range is Mexico.

Species:

Chaunanthus acuminatus 
Chaunanthus mexicanus 
Chaunanthus petiolatus 
Chaunanthus torulosus

References

Brassicaceae
Brassicaceae genera